Auli is in Chamoli district in the Himalayan mountains of Uttarakhand, India. Between June and October, the valley has one of highest numbers of flower species found anywhere in the world, with 520 species of high altitude plants, 498 of which are flowering plants with significant populations of endangered species.

History 
This place came to light when in the 8th century, Adiguru Shri Shankaracharya established a Matha (Jyotir Math or Shri Shankaracharya Math) at Joshimath, about 6.6 km from Auli, which still exists today. After the establishment of the monastery, this place also came to be known as the "Gateway of the Himalayas". After the establishment of this math, Adi Shankaracharya Ji moved forward like Badrinath. Semi-nomadic tribes of Tibetans, Mongolians and Bhotias conducted trade and communication between Tibet (China) and India from here. They took the help of their long haired yaks and horses to cross the snowy mountains of the Himalayas. The popular Trishul peak (23,490 feet) is the scene of an unusual expedition that took place here in 1958. It took the mountaineers almost four days to climb and about 90 minutes to ski down to the base.

Auli and Joshimath are situated in the high Himalayas bordering China. In the Sino-Indian War of 1962, there have been several initiatives by Chinese troops to cross the borders and enter Indian territory. During the conflict, the residents of the border village supported the Indian Army. Auli ropeway was constructed in September 1993 to enhance tourism in Auli. At an altitude of about 10,000 feet, this ropeway serves as a transport between Joshimath and Auli.

Tourism
Auli is a hiking and ski destination and after the creation of the state of Uttarakhand, formerly part of Uttar Pradesh, Auli was marketed as a tourist destination. It is surrounded by coniferous and oak forests, with a panoramic view of the peaks of the Himalayas. The slopes are intended for both professional skiers and novices. The Garhwal Mandal Vikas Nigam Limited (GMVNL) a state government agency which takes care of this resort, and Uttarakhand Tourism Department conduct winter sports competitions at Auli to encourage skiing in India.  It has a  cable car, a chairlift and a ski lift, along with a maintained trek route. There is a training facility of Indo-Tibetan Border Police. A small Hindu temple connected with the Hindu epic the Ramayana is also present.

Transportation
The nearest railway stations are Rishikesh railway station and Dehradun railway station.
Nearby attractions include Vishnu Prayag, Gorson Bugyal, Kuari Pass, Joshimath, Badrinath, and Tapovan.
Auli and Dehradun hosted the First South Asian Winter Games in 2011.

Gallery

Climate

References

External links 

 Auli – Uttarakhand Tourism
 Tourist places of Chamoli district: Auli

Tourist attractions in Uttarakhand
Ski areas and resorts in India
Aerial tramways in India
Cities and towns in Chamoli district